These are the official results of the Women's Long Jump event at the 1995 IAAF World Championships in Gothenburg, Sweden. There were 40 participating athletes, with two qualifying groups and the final held on Sunday August 6, 1995. The qualification mark was set at 6.75 metres.

Medalists

Schedule
All times are Central European Time (UTC+1)

Abbreviations
All results shown are in metres

Records

Qualifying round
Qualifying mark: 6.75 metres

Group A

Group B

Final

See also
 1994 Women's European Championships Long Jump (Helsinki)
 1998 Women's European Championships Long Jump (Budapest)
 1996 Women's Olympic Long Jump (Atlanta)

References
 Results

L
Long jump at the World Athletics Championships
1995 in women's athletics